Jonathan Clancy (born 12 March 1986) is an Irish hurler; he played in a variety of positions, but mostly at midfield for the Clare senior team.

Born in Clarecastle, County Clare, Clancy first played competitive hurling whilst at school at St. Flannan's College. He first played  in the inter-county leagues at the age of seventeen when he joined the Clare minor team, before later joining the under-21 side. He made his senior debut in the 2005 championship. Clancy went on to play for Clare for almost a decade, and won one All-Ireland medal as a non-playing substitute and one Waterford Crystal Cup medal. 

As a member of the Munster inter-provincial team at various times, Clancy won one Railway Cup medal as a non-playing substitute in 2007. At club level he is a two-time championship medallist with Clarecastle.

Throughout his career Clancy made 28 championship appearances. He announced his retirement from inter-county hurling on 7 February 2014.

Honours

Team

Clarecastle
Clare Senior Hurling Championship (2): 2003, 2005
Clare Junior A Football Championship (1): 2012

Clare
All-Ireland Senior Hurling Championship (1): 2013 (sub)
Waterford Crystal Cup (1): 2009

Connacht
Railway Cup (1): 2007 (sub)

References

1986 births
Living people
Clarecastle hurlers
Clare inter-county hurlers
Munster inter-provincial hurlers